Lin Chia-lung (born 13 February 1964) is a Taiwanese academic and Democratic Progressive Party (DPP) politician. He is the Secretary General to the President of Taiwan since 31 January 2023. He was elected mayor of Taichung City in November 2014 and took office on 25 December 2014. In the early 2000s he served in various capacities in the ROC Executive Yuan under DPP President Chen Shui-bian.

Background
Lin was born in Taipei City. After graduating from Taipei Municipal Jianguo High School, Lin Chia-lung attended National Taiwan University (NTU), where he received his BA (1986) and MA (1988) in political science. As a student representative at NTU, Lin was active in the NTU Society for the Study of Mainland China, and a participant in the "Love of Freedom" campus free speech movement. Lin played a key role in pushing for the direct election of the student council chairman by students, and was responsible for drafting the election plan proposed by students to the campus administration in 1984.

Lin left Taiwan for the United States to attend Yale University on a Fulbright scholarship from 1991 through 1994. He received master's degrees in philosophy (1992) and political science (1993), as well as a PhD in political science (1998). Returning to Taiwan after graduating from Yale, Lin served on the faculty of the political science department at National Chung Cheng University as an assistant professor from 1999 through 2004. His research interests include the democratization of Taiwan, as well as the political and economic development of the People's Republic of China, and has written several books on the subjects.

Lin is married to Liao Wan-ju.

Political career
Lin was appointed as an advisor to the National Security Council in 2000, and to the position of cabinet spokesman in 2003. Lin represented the government position in a debate against Legislator Kao Chin Su-mei, where he argued in favor of arms procurements which would be submitted to referendum the following year.

Due to his performance as cabinet spokesman, Lin was appointed director of the Government Information Office (GIO) by President Chen Shui-bian following his reelection in 2004. In January 2005, Lin authorized a GIO program encouraging donations to provide financial support for orphans of the 2004 Indian Ocean tsunami. Controversy over the program later arose in August 2005, five months after Lin had left GIO, surrounding the delay in disbursing NT$400 million in donations to various charities and NGOs. Media reports suggesting that the program had been neglected in the transition between Lin and his successor at GIO, Pasuya Yao were denied by GIO, which promised the funds would be disbursed by September 5.

Lin resigned from his position as GIO director in March 2005 to run as Democratic Progressive Party (DPP) candidate for mayor of Taichung City. In the ensuing elections held in December 2005, Lin lost against incumbent Mayor Jason Hu by 87,075 votes (19.3%).  In 2014 Lin ran again against Hu and won by a landslide margin, over 200,000 votes.

Lin was appointed DPP Secretary-General in January 2006, and Deputy Secretary-General to the President in October 2007.

Mayor of Taichung

2014 Taichung City mayor election
Lin defeated DPP legislator Tsai Chi-chang in a public opinion poll that served as the party's primary on 31 December 2013. He was elected as the Mayor of Taichung after winning the Taichung Mayoralty election on 29 November 2014 defeating incumbent Jason Hu of the Kuomintang.

2018 Taichung City mayor election

Minister of Transportation and Communications
Lin succeeded Wang Kwo-tsai on 14 January 2019 who was acting Minister of Transportation and Communications. He resigned on 4 April 2021 in the aftermath of the Hualien train derailment which killed at least 49 people, stating that he would take full political responsibility for the crash and will leave once the rescue work ends.

Later political career
After  decided not to contest the New Taipei mayoralty in July 2022, the Democratic Progressive Party selected Lin as its candidate for the post.

References

External links

 Official biography
 

1964 births
Living people
Democratic Progressive Party (Taiwan) politicians
National Taiwan University alumni
Politicians of the Republic of China on Taiwan from Taipei
Taiwanese political scientists
Taiwanese Ministers of Transportation and Communications
Yale University alumni
Mayors of Taichung
Members of the 8th Legislative Yuan
Fulbright alumni